Stallybrass is an English surname. Notable people with the surname include:

Anne Stallybrass (1938–2021), English actress
Edward Stallybrass (1794–1884), British Congregational missionary
William Stallybrass (1883–1948), British barrister

English-language surnames